George Watkin (born 14 April 1944) is an English former professional footballer who played in the Football League as a forward.

References

1944 births
Living people
English footballers
Association football forwards
Newcastle United F.C. players
King's Lynn F.C. players
Chesterfield F.C. players
Gateshead F.C. players
English Football League players